Prosopocoilus biplagiatus is a beetle of the Family Lucanidae. Size of males: 18 - 39 mm, females: 18 - 25 mm.

External links
Photos of Prosopocoilus biplagiatus

Lucaninae
Prosopocoilus
Beetles described in 1855